Adriana Ozores Muñoz (born 21 May 1959) is a Spanish theatre, film and television actress.

Biography
Adriana Ozores was born in Madrid on 21 May 1959. She is the daughter of actors  and Concepción Muñoz. Her father died when she was 9 years old. She is the niece of  the actor Antonio Ozores and the director Mariano Ozores and cousin of the actress Emma Ozores.

She won the Goya Award for her role in  A Time for Defiance directed by  Antonio Mercero.

She has a son, Adrián Climent Ozores, by ex-husband Joaquín Climent.

Selected filmography

Theatre
 Cuatro corazones con frenos marcha atrás (1986)
 La celestina (1988)
 El vergonzoso en palacio (1989)
 La verdad sospechosa (1991–1992)
 El desdén con el desdén (1991)
 Don Gil de las calzas verdes (Tirso de Molina, 1994).
 El misántropo (1996)
 Petit Pierre (2013-2014)

Television
 Los hombres de Paco (2005)
 Manolito Gafotas (TV) (Antonio Mercero, 2003)
 Periodistas
 Gran Hotel (2011-2013)
 Alba (2021)

Accolades 

Goya Award for Best Supporting Actress1999 La hora de los valientesCinema Writers Circle Awards for Best Actress2005 Hector  Montreal World Film Festival Award for Best Actress2005 Heroina  Malaga Spanish film festival Award for Best Actress 2005 Hector  Ondas Award for Best Actress 2000 Pleniulunio  Peñíscola Comedy Film Festival for Best Actress 1999 La Primera Noche de Vida 2000 Ataque Verbal  Spanish Actors Union Award 2005 Hector 2006 El Metodo  Seminici Award for Best Actress 2002 La Vida de Nadie Zapping Awards for Best Actress 2008 Los Hombres de Paco2012 Iris Award Best Actress "Gran Hotel"

References

External links
 http://sharplorraine.wix.com/adrianaozoresintl

1959 births
Living people
Actresses from Madrid
Best Supporting Actress Goya Award winners
Spanish film actresses
Spanish stage actresses
Spanish television actresses
20th-century Spanish actresses
21st-century Spanish actresses